Brittany Alexandria Sheets, known by her stage name Mars Argo, is an American singer, songwriter, actress, and internet personality.

Sheets is prominently known for her portrayal of a fictionalized stage persona of herself on YouTube. She became known as the lead singer of the indie rock band of the same name, named after her main stage persona. Mars Argo released their only album, Technology Is a Dead Bird, on November 6, 2009. The band continued to release extended plays such as Internet Sessions and Linden Place throughout 2010 and 2011. In a 2013 Vice article, the band stated that they were working on their own TV show along with a second album, but both projects were later abandoned.

Besides releasing music, Sheets co-produced, wrote, and directed content for her YouTube channel grocerybagdottv (renamed shouldicleanmyroom in 2022), formerly co-operated by her former partner Titanic Sinclair. The channel's content was often satirical, revolving around society and Internet culture. However, after the duo broke up in early 2014, all but three videos were removed from the channel. The only videos that still remain on the channel to this day are the music videos for "Using You", "Runaway Runaway", and a satirical video called "Delete Your Facebook".
In 2022, Sheets made a comeback with her debut solo single "Angry", and a subsequent audio video was uploaded onto the channel. On March 15, 2023 she returned with her new single titled "I Can Only Be Me".

Early life 
Brittany Alexandria Sheets was born in Saginaw, Michigan. Growing up, she played piano and sang in her church choir. She has stated that her mother never allowed her to play video games as a child, believing that they were a distraction from her studies. Before launching the YouTube project grocerybagdottv, Sheets attended university and was pursuing a major in biology.

Career

2009–2011: Career beginnings, Technology Is a Dead Bird, and Computer Show
After meeting Corey Michael Mixter (P.K.A. Titanic Sinclair) on Myspace, they cameoed and worked on the YouTube channel titled digitalfuntown. Sheets and Mixter later formed the alternative pop band Mars Argo. They also co-operated a YouTube channel under the title Grocerybagdottv (stylized in all lowercase), where they uploaded music-related content and a series of social commentary videos, initially dubbed Video Blog and later renamed Computer Show. Their most popular non-music video is a 2014 episode of this series, titled "Delete Your Facebook", mocking social media usage and the website of the same name. The music video for "Using You", the most well known single from the project, already counts more than 21 million views on the channel.

The band released their debut album, Technology Is a Dead Bird, on November 6, 2009. It was followed up with an acoustic EP, Internet Sessions, in 2010, and another EP, Linden Place, in 2011. They began working on an eventually scrapped and heavily delayed second album with Chicago-based producer, Johnny K, soon after Technology Is a Dead Bird was released.

2015–2019: Mars Argo breaks up 
Sheets and Mixter moved to Los Angeles in 2012, where they filmed and released the remainder of the YouTube channel's uploads, followed by the romantic separation of the couple in 2014. The band continued to perform during the South by Southwest festival in Austin, Texas, before going on a hiatus, being briefly revived in December of the same year, although permanently splitting up sometime in March 2015. According to a 2018 lawsuit filed by Sheets, the dissolvement of both the relationship and band was due to Mixter's incessant verbal abuse and physical violence.

Sheets resurfaced in April 2018, by addressing her absence, and promising new music in the future to her fans.

2020–present: Dinner in America, Angry and future projects 
Sheets portrayed Sissy in the film Dinner in America alongside Kyle Gallner, Emily Skeggs, Pat Healy, Griffin Gluck, Lea Thompson, and Mary Lynn Rajskub. The film was filmed in Detroit, Michigan and was selected to premiere at the 2020 Sundance Film Festival. On April 25, 2022, Sheets released her debut solo single, titled "Angry". The single was released onto streaming services and uploaded onto the now-renamed shouldicleanmyroom channel.

Lawsuit against Sinclair and Poppy 

On April 17, 2018, after a period of little to no activity, Sheets filed a 44-page lawsuit against Mixter and his collaborator at the time Poppy (real name Moriah Rose Pereira) alleging copyright infringement, stalking, and emotional and physical abuse being inflicted upon her by the two. That same day, Argo posted a message on her social media pages addressing the lawsuit, thanking her fans for their support and confirming new music to come. On May 7, Poppy made a public statement about the "frivolous" lawsuit, stating that Argo was attempting to manipulate her psychologically. She called the suit a "publicity campaign" and a "desperate grab for fame".

The lawsuit was dismissed on September 14, having been settled outside of court with agreements that Mixter and Pereira would not be in contact with Sheets, and with Sheets gaining all rights, title and interest to the Mars Argo music and brand. Pereira later publicly split with Mixter in December 2019, and alleged that she was a victim of "manipulative patterns" by him. However, Pereira has never publicly retracted her initial statements regarding the lawsuit and insists she was "never controlled" by Mixter, further stating that "he didn't want to make YouTube videos, but [she] begged him".

Discography

Studio albums

Compilation albums

Extended plays

Singles

Guest appearances

Music videos

Filmography

Footnotes

References

External links

Living people
Women satirists
American actresses
American indie rock musicians
American female models
Musicians from Saginaw, Michigan
American women pianists
American women pop singers
American women singer-songwriters
American indie pop musicians
21st-century American guitarists
21st-century American pianists
YouTubers from Michigan
21st-century American women singers
American women in electronic music
21st-century American women guitarists
Year of birth missing (living people)
Singer-songwriters from Michigan